Phillips disasters may refer to:

 1989 Phillips disaster, a series of explosions and fire on October 23, 1989, in Pasadena, Texas
 1999 Phillips disaster, an explosion and fire on June 23, 1999, in Pasadena, Texas
 2000 Phillips disaster, an explosion and fire on March 27, 2000, in Pasadena, Texas